Atonement is a 2007 romantic war drama film directed by Joe Wright and starring James McAvoy, Keira Knightley, Romola Garai, Saoirse Ronan, and Vanessa Redgrave. It is based on the 2001 novel of the same name by Ian McEwan. The film chronicles a crime and its consequences over the course of six decades, beginning in the 1930s. It was produced for StudioCanal and filmed in England. Distributed in most of the world by Universal Studios, it was released theatrically in the United Kingdom on 7 September 2007 and in North America on 7 December 2007.

Atonement opened both the 2007 Vancouver International Film Festival and the 64th Venice International Film Festival, making Wright, at age 35, the youngest director ever to open the Venice event. The film was a commercial success and earned a worldwide gross of approximately $129 million against a budget of $30 million. It received rave reviews, with critics praising its acting, emotional depth, Wright's direction, Dario Marianelli's score, the cinematography and visuals.

Atonement won an Oscar for Best Original Score at the 80th Academy Awards and was nominated for six others, including Best Picture, Best Adapted Screenplay, and Best Supporting Actress for Ronan. It also garnered fourteen nominations at the 61st British Academy Film Awards, winning both Best Film and Production Design, and won the Golden Globe Award for Best Motion Picture – Drama.

Plot

In 1935 England, 13-year-old Briony Tallis, the youngest daughter of the wealthy Tallis family, is set to perform a play she wrote for an upcoming family gathering. She spies on her older sister, Cecilia and the housekeeper's son, Robbie Turner (with whom Briony is infatuated), from her bedroom window.  During their (Cecilia's and Robbie's) argument near the fountain, Robbie accidentally breaks a vase and yells at Cecilia to stay where she is – so as to avoid cutting her feet on the broken pieces on the ground. Still angered, Cecilia then strips off her outer clothing, stares at him and climbs into the fountain to retrieve one of the pieces. Briony observes all this from the window, and misinterprets the relationship between Cecilia and Robbie.

Robbie drafts a note to Cecilia to apologise for the incident. In one draft of the note, he pens his true, unfiltered feelings of attraction for Cecilia in very explicit language.  Although he never intends for Cecilia (or anyone else) to see this version of the note, he mistakenly places it (instead of the second more formal note he drafts) in an envelope which he asks Briony to deliver to Cecilia.  Only after Briony departs does he realise the wrong version of the note is in the envelope destined for Cecilia's hands.  Making matters worse, Briony reads the letter before giving it to Cecilia. Later, she describes the note to her 15-year-old visiting cousin, Lola, who calls Robbie a "sex maniac". 
Paul Marshall, a visiting friend of Briony's older brother, introduces himself to the visiting cousins and appears to be attracted to Lola. Before dinner, Robbie and Cecilia are alone in the library, at which time he apologises to Cecilia for the obscene letter but, to his surprise, she confesses her secret love for him. They proceed to make passionate love against the wall in the library as Briony walks in unseen and sees them together; Briony mistakenly thinks her sister is being raped.

During dinner, Lola's twin brothers go missing and the household organises into search parties. While participating in the search, Briony comes across Lola being raped by a man who flees upon being discovered.  The two girls talk and Briony becomes convinced that it was Robbie; a confused Lola does not dissent, and the two return home. Later, Robbie — who finds the twins unharmed — returns to the house to see everyone waiting for him suspiciously.  He ushers the twins inside and is promptly arrested despite Cecilia's pleas of his innocence.  Lola and Briony's testimony, along with her turning over the explicit letter, convinces everyone but Cecilia of his guilt.

Four years later, during the Second World War, Robbie is released from prison on the condition that he joins the army and fights in the Battle of France. Separated from his unit, he makes his way on foot to Dunkirk. He thinks back to six months earlier when he met Cecilia, now a nurse. Briony, now 18, joined Cecilia's old nursing unit at St Thomas' Hospital in London rather than go to the University of Cambridge. She writes to her sister, but Cecilia cannot forgive her for her part in Robbie's arrest and conviction years earlier. Robbie, who is gravely ill from an infected wound and hallucinating, finally arrives at the beaches of Dunkirk, where he awaits evacuation.

Later, Briony, who regrets implicating Robbie, learns from a newsreel that Paul Marshall, who now owns a factory supplying rations to the British army, is about to marry Lola. As Briony attends the wedding, it finally sinks in  that it was Paul who assaulted Lola during the search for the twins years ago. Briony visits Cecilia to apologise directly, and suggests correcting her testimony to which Cecilia says she would be an "unreliable witness". Briony is surprised to find Robbie there living with her sister, while in London on leave. Briony apologises for her deceit, but Robbie is enraged that she has still not accepted responsibility for her actions. Cecilia calms him down and then Robbie instructs Briony how to set the record straight and get Robbie's conviction overturned. Briony agrees. Cecilia adds that Briony include what she remembers of Danny Hardman, but Briony points out that Paul Marshall was the rapist and Cecilia adds he has just married Lola and now Lola will not be able to testify against her husband.

Decades later, when Briony is an elderly and successful novelist, she gives an interview about her latest and last book, an autobiographical novel titled Atonement, and explains she is dying from vascular dementia. During the interview, the audience learns that the portion of the book where Robbie and Cecilia are living together and she (Briony) attempts to apologize to them is completely fictitious. The reality is that she could never atone for her mistake, and Cecilia and Robbie were never reunited; Robbie died of septicaemia from his infected wound on the morning of the evacuation at Dunkirk, and Cecilia died months later after drowning during an underground flood due to the Balham tube station bombing during the Blitz. Briony admits that she wrote her novel with its fictitious ending to give the two, in fiction and in death, the happiness they never had because she was responsible for mistakenly identifying Robbie as Lola's rapist. The last scene shows an imagined and happily reunited Cecilia and Robbie staying in the house by the sea which they had intended to visit once they were reunited.

Cast

 James McAvoy as Robbie Turner, the son of the Tallis family housekeeper with a Cambridge education courtesy of his mother's employer.
 Keira Knightley as Cecilia Tallis, the elder of the two Tallis sisters. 
 Romola Garai as Briony Tallis, aged 18, the younger Tallis sister and a nurse-in-training.
 Saoirse Ronan as Briony, aged 13, an aspiring novelist.
 Vanessa Redgrave as older Briony, now a successful novelist.
 Brenda Blethyn as Grace Turner, Robbie's mother and the Tallis family housekeeper.
 Juno Temple as Lola Quincey, the visiting 15-year-old cousin of the Tallis siblings.
 Benedict Cumberbatch as Paul Marshall, Leon Tallis's visiting friend.
 Patrick Kennedy as Leon Tallis, the eldest of the Tallis siblings.
 Harriet Walter as Emily Tallis, the matriarch of the family.
 Peter Wight as Police Inspector.
 Daniel Mays as Tommy Nettle, one of Robbie's brothers-in-arms.
 Nonso Anozie as Frank Mace, another fellow soldier.
 Gina McKee as Sister Drummond.
 Jérémie Renier as Luc Cornet, a fatally wounded and brain-damaged French soldier whom the 18-year-old Briony comforts on his deathbed.
 Michelle Duncan as Fiona Maguire, Briony's nursing friend at St Thomas' Hospital.
 Alfie Allen as Danny Hardman, a worker on the Tallis estate.

In addition, film director and playwright Anthony Minghella briefly appears as the television interviewer in the final scene. Minghella died six months after the film was released, aged 54, following cancer surgery.

Production

Pre-production
Director Joe Wright asked executive producers, Debra Hayward, Liza Chasin, and co-producer Jane Frazer to collaborate a second time, after working on Pride and Prejudice in 2005.  He also sought out production designer Sarah Greenwood, editor Paul Tothill, costume designer Jacqueline Durran, and composer Dario Marianelli, for the film—all of whom previously worked together with Wright. In an interview, Wright states, "It's important for me to work with the same people. It makes me feel safe, and we kind of understand each other." The screenplay was adapted from Ian McEwan's 2001 novel by Christopher Hampton.

After reading McEwan's book, screenwriter Christopher Hampton, who had previously undertaken many adaptations, was inspired to adapt it into a script for a feature film. When Wright took over the project as director, he decided he wanted a different approach, and Hampton re-wrote much of his original script to Wright's suggestion. The first draft – written with director Richard Eyre in mind – took what Hampton called a more "conventional, literary approach," with a linear structure, and a voiceover and the epilogue of the older Briony being woven in throughout the entire film instead of only at the end. Wright felt that the original approach owed more to contemporary filmmaking than historical filmmaking, while the second script was closer to the book.

To re-create the World War II setting, producers hired a historian to work with the department heads. Background research for the film included the examination of paintings, photographs and films, and the study of archives. The war scenes, as well as many others scenes, were filmed on-location. Set decorator Katie Spencer and production designer Sarah Greenwood both examined archives from Country Life to find suitable locations for the interior and exterior scenes. Seamus McGarvey, the cinematographer, worked closely with Wright on the aesthetics of the visualisation, using a range of techniques and camera movements to achieve the final result.

Casting
Casting the film was a lengthy process for Wright, particularly choosing the right actors for his protagonists. Having previously worked with Keira Knightley on Pride & Prejudice (2005), he expressed his admiration for her, stating, "I think she's a really extraordinary actress". Referencing her character's unlikeability, Wright commended on Knightley's bravery in tackling this type of role without any fear of how the audience will receive this characterisation, stating "It's a character that's not always likeable and I think so many young actors these days are terrified of being disliked at any given moment in case the audience doesn't come and pay their box-office money to see them again. Keira is not afraid of that. She puts her craft first." As opposed to casting McAvoy, "Knightley was in almost the opposite position—that of a sexy, beautiful movie star who, despite having worked steadily since she was seven, was widely underestimated as an actress." In preparation for her role, Knightley watched films from the 1930s and 1940s, such as Brief Encounter and In Which We Serve, to study the "naturalism" of the performance that Wright wanted in Atonement.

James McAvoy, despite turning down previous offers to work with Wright, nonetheless remained the director's first choice. Producers met several actors for the role of Robbie, but McAvoy was the only one who was offered the part. He fit Wright's bid for someone who "had the acting ability to take the audience with him on his personal and physical journey." McAvoy describes Robbie as one of the most difficult characters he has ever played, "because he's very straight-ahead." Further describing his casting process, Wright commented how "there is something undeniably charming about McAvoy". One of the most important qualities that particularly resonated with Wright was "McAvoy's own working-class roots," which McAvoy noted was something that Wright was very much interested in. Once Wright put both Knightley and McAvoy together, their "palpable sexual chemistry" immediately became apparent. The biggest risk Wright took in casting McAvoy was that "The real question was whether the five-foot-seven, slightly built, ghostly pale Scotsman had what it takes to be a true screen idol."

Casting the role of Briony Tallis also proved challenging, yet once Wright discovered Saoirse Ronan her involvement enabled Wright to finally commence filming. On the casting process for the role of Briony, Wright commented how "We met many, many kids for that role. Then we were sent this tape of this little girl speaking in this perfect 1920s English accent. Immediately, she had this kind of intensity, dynamism, and willfulness." After inviting Ronan to come to London to read for the part, Wright was not only surprised by her Irish accent, but immediately recognised her unique acting ability. Upon casting Ronan, Wright revealed how completing this final casting decision enabled "the film to be what it became" and considered her participation in the film "lucky."

Abbie Cornish was pegged for the role of 18-year-old Briony, but had to back out due to scheduling conflicts with Elizabeth: The Golden Age. Romola Garai was cast instead, and was obliged to adapt her performance's physicality to fit the appearance that had already been decided upon for Ronan and Redgrave. Garai spent much time with Ronan, and watched footage of her to approximate the way the younger actress moved. Vanessa Redgrave became everyone's ideal to play the elderly Briony and was the first approached (although she was not cast until Ronan had been found), and committed herself to the role after just one meeting with Wright. Redgrave, Ronan and Garai worked together with a voice coach to keep the character's timbre in a familiar range throughout the film.

Filming
Produced by StudioCanal, Atonement was filmed in Great Britain during the summer of 2006.

Due to restrictions in the filming schedule, production only had two full days to film all the war scenes on Dunkirk beach, and the lack of budget to fund the 1000+ extras needed to shoot these scenes, Joe Wright and cinematographer Seamus McGarvey were forced to reduce the shooting to a -minute long take following James McAvoy's character as he moved a quarter of a mile along the beach.

The first of the two days, and part of the second day, were dedicated to blocking and rehearsing the sequence until the sun was in the correct position in the afternoon ready to shoot. The shot took  takes. The fourth was abandoned mid-flow due to the lighting becoming too bad for shooting. They ended up using the third take. The sequence was accomplished by Steadicam operator, Peter Robertson, moving between using a tracking vehicle, to being on foot, to using a rickshaw via a ramp and then back to on foot.

Locations

Shooting locations for Atonement were primarily:
Stokesay Court, Onibury, Shropshire.
The seafront in Redcar.  (This work included an acclaimed five-minute tracking shot of the seafront as a war-torn Dunkirk and a scene in the local cinema on the promenade.)
The Grimsby ice factory on Grimsby Docks, both the interior and exterior of the building, were locations used for the Dunkirk street scenes.
Streatham Hill, London (used for neighboring Balham, Cecilia's new home after breaking with her family).

Additional locations used in London were Great Scotland Yard and Bethnal Green Town Hall, the latter being used for a 1939 tea-house scene, as well as the church of St John's, Smith Square, Westminster for Lola's wedding. Re-enactment of the 1940 Balham station disaster took place in the former Piccadilly line station of Aldwych, which has been closed since the 1990s.

The war scenes in the French countryside were filmed in Coates and Gedney Drove End, Lincolnshire; Walpole St Andrew and Denver, Norfolk; and in Manea and Pymoor, Cambridgeshire.

Much of the St Thomas's hospital ward interior scenes were filmed at Park Place, Berkshire and the exterior scenes were filmed at University College London.

All the exteriors and interiors of the Tallis family home were filmed at Stokesay Court, which was selected from an old Country Life edition to tie in with the period and pool fountain of the novel. This mansion was built in 1889, commissioned by the glove manufacturer John Derby Allcroft. It remains an undivided, private home.

The third portion of Atonement was entirely filmed at the BBC Television Centre in London. The beach with cliffs first shown on the postcard and later seen towards the end of the film was Cuckmere Haven Seven Sisters, Sussex (near Roedean School, which Cecilia was said to have attended).

Release

Theatrical
Atonement opened at the 2007 Venice International Film Festival, making Wright—at the age of 35—the youngest director ever to be so honoured. The film also opened at the 2007 Vancouver International Film Festival. Atonement was released in the United Kingdom and Ireland on 7 September 2007, and in North America on 7 December 2007, along with a worldwide theatrical distribution which was managed by Universal Pictures, with minor releases through other divisions on 7 September 2007.

Home media
Atonement was released on DVD in the United States on 3 January 2008 in region 2, which was followed by a release in Blu-ray edition on 13 March 2012. In the UK, the film was released on DVD on 4 February 2010, on Amazon (in the UK), and on Blu-ray on 27 May 2010.

Reception

Box office
Atonement grossed a cumulative $131,016,624 worldwide and $784,145 in the US on its opening weekend—9 December 2007.  The estimated budget for the film was  $30,000,000. The film's total gross revenue is $23,934,714 (worldwide) and $50,927,067 in the US.

Critical response

Atonement received positive reviews from film critics. The review site Rotten Tomatoes records that 83% of 219 critics gave the film positive reviews, with an average rating of 7.40 of a possible score of 10. The consensus reads, "Atonement features strong performances, brilliant cinematography and a unique score. Featuring deft performances from James McAvoy and Keira Knightley, it's a successful adaptation of Ian McEwan's novel." On other review sites, Metacritic records an average score of 85%, based on 36 reviews.

In Britain, the film was listed as number three on Empires Top 25 Films of 2007. The American critic Roger Ebert gave it a four-star review, dubbing it "one of the year's best films, a certain best picture nominee". In the film review television program, At the Movies with Ebert & Roeper, Richard Roeper gave the film a "thumbs up," adding that Knightley gave "one of her best performances." As for the film, he commented that "Atonement has hints of greatness but it falls just short of Oscar contention." The film received near-unanimous praise on its release, with its casting solidifying Knightley as a leading star in British period dramas while igniting McAvoy's career in leading roles. It also catapulted the trajectory of a young (Saoirse) Ronan. Upon its release,  The Daily Telegraph David Gritten describes how "Critics who have seen Atonement have reacted with breathless superlatives, and its showing at Venice and [its] subsequent release will almost certainly catapult Wright into the ranks of world-class film directors." The film received many positive reviews for its adherence to McEwan's novel, with Variety reporting that the film "preserves much of the tome's metaphysical depth and all of its emotional power," and commenting that "Atonement is immensely faithful to McEwan's novel." Author Ian McEwan also worked as an executive producer on the film.

Not all reviews were as favourable. Although The Atlantics Christopher Orr praises Knightley's performance as "strong" and McAvoy as "likeable and magnetic," he concludes by saying "Atonement is a film out of balance, nimble enough in its first-half but oddly scattered and ungainly once it leaves the grounds of the Tallis estate," and remains "a workmanlike yet vaguely disappointing adaptation of a masterful novel." The New York Times'''  A. O. Scott comes to a similar conclusion, saying "Mr. McAvoy and Ms. Knightley sigh and swoon credibly enough, but they are stymied by the inertia of the filmmaking, and by the film's failure to find a strong connection between the fates of the characters and the ideas and historical events that swirl around them."

On a more positive note, The New York Observers Rex Reed considers Atonement his "favorite film of the year," deeming it "everything a true lover of literature and movies could possibly hope for," and particularly singling out McAvoy stating "the film's star in an honest, heart-rending performance of strength and integrity that overcomes the romantic slush it might have been," and praising Ronan as a "staggeringly assured youngster," while being underwhelmed by a "serenely bland Keira Knightley." Adding to the film's authentic adaptation, David Gritten once again notes how "If Atonement feels like a triumph, it's a totally British one." McAvoy is singled out: "His performance as Robbie Turner, the son of a housekeeper at a country estate, raised with ambitions but appallingly wronged, holds the movie together."

Top ten lists
The film appeared on many critics' top ten lists of the best films of 2007.

AccoladesAtonement received numerous awards and nominations, including seven Golden Globe nominations—more than any other film nominated at the 65th Golden Globe Awards—and winning two of the nominated Golden Globes, including Best Motion Picture Drama. The film also received 14 BAFTA nominations for the 61st British Academy Film Awards including Best Film, Best British Film and Best Director, seven Academy Award nominations, including Best Picture, and the Evening Standard British Film Award for technical achievement in cinematography, and awards for production design and costume design, earned by Seamus McGarvey, Sarah Greenwood and Jacqueline Durran, respectively. Atonement ranks 442nd on Empire magazine's 2008 list of the 500 greatest movies of all time.Atonement has been named among the Top 10 Films of 2007 by the Austin Film Critics Association, the Dallas-Fort Worth Film Critics Association, New York Film Critics Online and the Southeastern Film Critics Association.

Cultural impact

The green dress Cecilia wears during the love scene in the library garnered considerable interest. At the ten-year anniversary of the film's American premiere, the film's costume designer Jacqueline Durran called it "unforgettable."

Historical inaccuracies
The film shows an Avro Lancaster bomber flying overhead in 1935, an aircraft whose first flight was not until 1941.

During the scene in 1935 in which Robbie writes and discards letters for Cecilia, he keeps playing a record of the love duet from Act 1 of La bohème, with Victoria de los Ángeles and Jussi Björling singing, which was not recorded until 1956.

In the scene on the Dunkirk beach, Robbie is told that the Lancastria'' has been sunk, an event that actually happened two weeks after the Dunkirk evacuations.

A detail reported as a historical inaccuracy is the date of the Balham tube station disaster. It happened before midnight 14 October 1940. Old Briony mentions 15 October as the date, which would have been the day the news of the deadly flooding broke.

See also
 Atonement (soundtrack)

References

External links

  (UK)
 
 
 
 
 Close-Up Film Interview – Atonement

2007 films
2007 romantic drama films
2000s war drama films
BAFTA winners (films)
Best Drama Picture Golden Globe winners
Best Film BAFTA Award winners
British romantic drama films
British war drama films
Dunkirk evacuation films
Fiction with unreliable narrators
Films scored by Dario Marianelli
Films about atonement
Films about interclass romance
Films about miscarriage of justice
Films about writers
Films based on British novels
Films directed by Joe Wright
Films produced by Tim Bevan
Films produced by Eric Fellner
Films about the upper class
Films set in the 1930s
Films set in the 1940s
Films set in country houses
Films set in England
Films set in France
Films shot in Berkshire
Films shot in Cambridgeshire
Films shot in East Sussex
Films shot in Lincolnshire
Films shot in London
Films shot in Norfolk
Films shot in North Yorkshire
Films shot in Shropshire
Films that won the Best Original Score Academy Award
British historical romance films
British nonlinear narrative films
French nonlinear narrative films
War romance films
Focus Features films
StudioCanal films
Universal Pictures films
Working Title Films films
British World War II films
French World War II films
Films about sisters
Relativity Media films
2000s English-language films
2000s British films
2000s French films